The women's 200 metres event at the 2009 Summer Universiade was held on 9–10 July.

Medalists

Results

Heats
Qualification: First 3 of each heat (Q) and the next 6 fastest (q) qualified for the semifinals.

Wind:Heat 1: -0.2 m/s, Heat 2: +0.5 m/s, Heat 3: +0.7 m/s, Heat 4: +1.2 m/s, Heat 5: +1.1 m/s, Heat 6: +1.3 m/s

Semifinals
Qualification: First 2 of each semifinal (Q) and the next 2 fastest (q) qualified for the finals.

Wind:Heat 1: +0.9 m/s, Heat 2: +1.0 m/s, Heat 3: +2.6 m/s

Final
Wind: +0.4 m/s

References

Results (archived)

200
2009 in women's athletics